Pavonia multiflora, the Brazilian candles or many flowers, is a species of flowering plant in the Hibisceae tribe of the mallow family Malvaceae. It is an evergreen shrub native to Brazil.

The leaves are lance-shaped, about six inches long. The red or dark pink bracts surround cone-shaped purple upright flowers - about 6 cm across - with protruding dark blue stamens. The flowering period usually extends from late Spring to early Fall, but in the right conditions this plant can bloom all winter long.

It is normally grown as a houseplant in temperate zones, where it requires a humid environment and temperatures above . It has gained the Royal Horticultural Society’s Award of Garden Merit.

References

Hibisceae
Flora of Brazil